Niblo's Garden was a theater on Broadway and Crosby Street, near Prince Street, in SoHo, Manhattan, New York City. It was established in 1823 as "Columbia Garden" which in 1828 gained the name of the Sans Souci and was later the property of the coffeehouse proprietor and caterer William Niblo. The large theater that evolved in several stages, occupying more and more of the pleasure ground, was twice burned and rebuilt. On September 12, 1866, Niblo's saw the premiere of The Black Crook, considered to be the first piece of musical theater that conforms to the modern notion of a "book musical".

Evolution of the building site
William Niblo built Niblo's Theater in 1834 after having opened a "resort" which at first only served coffee, ice cream, lemonade and other refreshments. At the time New York was undergoing a construction boom that was extending clusters of buildings much past the locale of City Hall. The garden, surrounded by a plain board fence, covered the block bounded by Prince, Houston, Broadway and Crosby Streets; in the center was the open-air saloon, used also for musical entertainments. In the evenings, Niblo's Garden was illuminated with hundreds of colored-glass  lanterns. A separate garden entrance was on Broadway. The refreshment hall was in a pair of rowhouses near the southeast corner of the gardens. The site was once a part of the Bayard farm. It was sold in lots and purchased by Jeremiah Van Rensselaer. Prior to Niblo's acquisition of the land, a circus called the Stadium occupied the ground. There was a high fence around it. New Yorkers considered it a beautiful drive up to Niblo's through neighboring suburban market gardens.

Niblo decided to supplement the refreshments with more extensive entertainment. He erected the Grand Saloon, a small theater or concert hall. The program consisted solely of musical selections until vaudeville was introduced some time later. The admission to the garden in August 1829 was fifty cents, sufficient to keep out the riff-raff. During the afternoon and evening stagecoaches ran there from the City Hotel, later the location of the Boreel Building at 115 Broadway.

In 1835, Niblo's Garden hosted P. T. Barnum's first ever exhibition, marking his entry into show business. In 1845, the Hutchinson Family Singers included in their sold-out performance here their abolitionist song "Get Off the Track".

During the summer of 1837, a vaudeville company was formed at Niblo's by Joseph Judson and Joseph Sefton. Farces like Promotion of the General's Hat and Meg Young Wife and Old Umbrella, played there. By the mid-19th century, the theatre was considered New York's most fashionable theatre.

Second Niblo's Garden
The first theater at Niblo's Garden was destroyed by a fire on September 18, 1846. It was not reopened until the summer of 1849. The theatre seated approximately 3,200 people and had the best-equipped stage in the city. Italian opera began to be produced there around 1850. Seats were sold at $2 each. Niblo's began to draw the most popular actors and plays. Some of the many players who performed there were E. L. Davenport, William Wheatley, Bennett Barrow, and Maggie Mitchell. In 1855, Niblo convinced the tightrope walker Charles Blondin to come to America and appear at the Garden.

In the late 1860s, as post-Civil War business boomed, there was a sharp increase in the number of working and middle-class people in New York, and these more affluent people sought entertainment. Theaters became more popular, and Niblo's began to offer light comedy. It mounted The Black Crook (1866), considered by many scholars to be the first musical comedy. This was followed by The White Fawn (1868), Le Barbe Blue (1868) and Evangeline (1874). In April 1850 the theatre presented the United States premiere of Giuseppe Verdi's Macbeth with Angiolina Bosio as Lady Macbeth.

Third Niblo's Garden and final days
The theater was again destroyed by fire in 1872. It was rebuilt by the department-store magnate A. T. Stewart.

The final performance at Niblo's Garden was given on March 23, 1895. A few weeks later the building was demolished to make way for a large office structure erected by sugar-refining titan Henry O. Havemeyer. Only a bit earlier he had purchased the Metropolitan Hotel and the theater.

Niblo's location later became occupied by early-20th century commercial buildings that span the block between Broadway and Crosby Street; one is the former site of the Museum of Comic and Cartoon Art.

Plays presented at Niblo's

References
Notes

Bibliography

; published as:

External links

1849 establishments in New York (state)
Broadway (Manhattan)
Buildings and structures demolished in 1895
Burned buildings and structures in the United States
Cast-iron architecture in New York City
Demolished buildings and structures in Manhattan
Demolished theatres in New York City
Former theatres in Manhattan
Rebuilt buildings and structures in the United States
SoHo, Manhattan
Theatres completed in 1834
Theatres completed in 1849